Dixieland is a traditional style of jazz music.

Dixieland may also refer to:

 An alternative rendering of Dixie - a nickname for the Southern United States, particularly states that comprised the Confederate States of America
 Dixieland (film), a 2015 American crime drama film
 Dixieland, California, an unincorporated community in Imperial County, California
 Dixieland Historic District, a historic district in Lakeland, Florida
 Dixieland Jazz (TV series), a Canadian music TV series which aired in 1954
 Dixieland Plus, the 1977 debut album by Harry Connick Jr.
 Dixieland (train), a 1950s incarnation of a Chicago to Miami passenger train
 Dixieland (composition), a 1960 Dixieland jazz composition by Tex Grant
 Dixie Land (film), a 2015 Ukrainian documentary film
 Dixie (song), American folk song from 1859

See also
 
 Dixie (disambiguation)